This is a list of species in the agaric genus Psilocybe.

A B C D E F G H I J K L M N O P Q R S T U V U W X Y Z

A 

Psilocybe acadiensis (Smith)
Psilocybe acutipilea (Speg.) Guzmán, psychoactive
 Psilocybe aerugineomaculans (Hohn.) Singer & A.H. Smith
 Psilocybe allenii Borov., Rockefeller & P.G.Werner
 Psilocybe alutacea Y.S. Chang & A.K. Mills
Psilocybe angulospora Yen W. Wang & S.S. Tzean 
 Psilocybe angustipleurocystidiata Guzmán, psychoactive
 Psilocybe antioquiensis Guzmán, Saldarr., Pineda, G. Garcia & L.-F. Velazquez, psychoactive
 Psilocybe atlantis Guzmán, Hanlin & C. White, psychoactive
 Psilocybe aquamarina (Pegler) Guzmán
 Psilocybe araucariicola P. S. Silva, likely psychoactive
 Psilocybe aucklandiae Guzmán, C.C. King & Bandala, psychoactive
 Psilocybe aztecorum R. Heim
 Psilocybe aztecorum var. bonetii (Guzman) Guzmán (a.k.a. Psilocybe bonetii Guzmán)
 Psilocybe azurescens Stamets & Gartz

B 
 Psilocybe baeocystis Singer & A.H. Smith
 Psilocybe banderillensis Guzmán
 Psilocybe brasiliensis Guzmán
 Psilocybe brunneocystidiata Guzmán & Horak

C 

 Psilocybe cabiensis Guzmán, M.Torres & Ram.-Guill
 Psilocybe caeruleoannulata Singer ex Guzmán
 Psilocybe caerulescens
 Psilocybe caerulescens Murrill var. caerulescens
 Psilocybe caerulescens var. ombrophila (R. Heim) Guzmán
 Psilocybe caerulipes (Peck) Sacc.
 Psilocybe carbonaria Singer
 Psilocybe chiapanensis Guzmán
 Psilocybe chuxiongensis T.Ma & K.D.Hyde
 Psilocybe cinnamomea J.F.Liang, Yang K.Li & Ye Yuan – China
 Psilocybe collybioides Singer & A.H. Smith
 Psilocybe columbiana Guzmán
Psilocybe congolensis Guzmán
 Psilocybe coprinifacies (Rolland) Pouzar s. auct., non s. Herink, non s. Krieglsteiner (see discussion)
 Psilocybe cordispora R. Heim
 Psilocybe cubensis (Earle) Singer
 Psilocybe cyanescens Wakef. (non sensu Krieglsteiner)
 Psilocybe cyanofibrillosa Guzmán & Stamets

D 
 Psilocybe dumontii Singer ex Guzmán

E 
 Psilocybe egonii Guzmán & T.J. Baroni
 Psilocybe eximia E. Horak & Desjardin

F 
 Psilocybe fagicola R. Heim & Cailleux
 Psilocybe farinacea Rick ex Guzmán (a.k.a. Psilocybe albofimbriata (Rick) Singer)
 Psilocybe fasciata Hongo
Psilocybe ferrugineolateritia Smith
 Psilocybe fimetaria (P.D. Orton) Watling (a.k.a. Psilocybe caesieannulata Singer; Stropharia fimetaria P.D. Orton)
 Psilocybe fuliginosa (Murrill) A.H. Smith
 Psilocybe furtadoana Guzmán
 Psilocybe fuscofulva Peck, not psychoactive

G 
Psilocybe galindoi Guzmán, Nova, Hedwigia
Psilocybe gallaeciae Guzmán
 Psilocybe graveolens Peck
 Psilocybe guatapensis Guzmán, Saldarriaga, Pineda, Garcia & Velazquez
 Psilocybe guilartensis Guzmán, Tapia & Nieves-Rivera

H 
 Psilocybe heimii Guzmán
 Psilocybe herrerae Guzmán
 Psilocybe hispanica Guzmán
 Psilocybe hoogshagenii R. Heim var. hoogshagenii (a.k.a. Psilocybe caerulipes var. gastonii Singer; Psilocybe zapotecorum R. Heim s. Singer)
 Psilocybe hoogshagenii R. Heim var. convexa Guzmán (a.k.a. Psilocybe semperviva R. Heim & Cailleux)

I 
 Psilocybe inconspicua Guzmán & Horak
 Psilocybe indica Sathe & J.T. Daniel
 Psilocybe isabelae Guzmán

J 
 Psilocybe jacobsii Guzmán
 Psilocybe jaliscana Guzmán

K 
 Psilocybe keralensis K.A. Thomas, Manim. & Guzmán
 Psilocybe kumaenorum R. Heim

L 
 Psilocybe laurae Guzmán
 Psilocybe lazoi Singer (this is a doubtful neurotropic species, considered first by Guzmán (1983) as a synonym of Psilocybe zapotecorum, but Singer, 1986, claimed that this is a non-bluing fungus independent of that of Guzmán, 1983]
 Psilocybe liniformans var. liniformans Guzmán & Bas
 Psilocybe liniformans var. americana Guzmán & Stamets

M 
 Psilocybe magnispora E. Horak, Guzmán & Desjardin
 Psilocybe mairei Singer (a.k.a. Hypholoma cyanescens Maire; Geophila cyanescens (Maire) Kuhner & Romagn.; non Psilocybe cyanescens s. Krieglsteiner]
 Psilocybe makarorae Johnst. & Buchanan
 Psilocybe mammillata (Murrill) A.H. Smith
 Psilocybe medullosa (Bres.) Borovička
 Psilocybe meridensis Guzmán
 Psilocybe meridionalis Guzmán, Ram.-Guill. & Guzm.-Dáv.
 Psilocybe mescaleroensis Guzmán, Walstad, E. Gándara & Ram.-Guill.
 Psilocybe mesophylla Guzmán, J. Q. Jacobs & Escalona 
 Psilocybe mexicana R. Heim
 Psilocybe moseri Guzmán
 Psilocybe muliercula Singer & A.H. Smith (a.k.a. Psilocybe wassonii R. Heim)

N 
 Psilocybe natalensis Gartz, Reid, Smith & Eicker
 Psilocybe natarajanii Guzmán (a.k.a. Psilocybe aztecorum var. bonetii (Guzman) Guzmáns. Natarajan & Raman]

O 
 Psilocybe oaxacana Guzmán, Escalona & J. Q. Jacobs*
 Psilocybe ovoideocystidiata Guzmán et Gaines

P 
 Psilocybe papuana Guzmán & Horak
 Psilocybe paulensis (Guzmán & Bononi) Guzmán (a.k.a. Psilocybe banderiliensis var. paulensis Guzmán & Bononi)
 Psilocybe pelliculosa (A.H. Smith) Singer & A.H. Smith
 Psilocybe pericystis Singer
 Psilocybe pintonii Guzmán
 Psilocybe pleurocystidiosa Guzmán
 Psilocybe plutonia (Berk. & M.A. Curtis) Sacc.
 Psilocybe portoricensis Guzmán, Tapia & Nieves-Rivera
 Psilocybe pseudoaztecorum Natarajan & Raman (a.k.a. Psilocybe aztecorum var. aztecorum sensu Natarajan & Raman; Psilocybe subaztecorum''' Guzmán, 1995)
 Psilocybe puberula Bas & Noordel.

 Q 
 Psilocybe quebecensis Ola'h & R. Heim

 R 
 Psilocybe rickii Guzmán & Cortez
 Psilocybe rostrata (Petch) Pegler
 Psilocybe ruiliensis Psilocybe rzedowskii Guzmán

 S 

 Psilocybe samuiensis Guzmán, Bandala & Allen
 Psilocybe schultesii Guzmán & S.H. Pollock
 Psilocybe semiangustipleurocystidiata Guzmán, Ram.-Guill. & M.Torres
 Psilocybe semilanceata (Fr. : Secr.) Kumm. (a.k.a. Psilocybe semilanceata var. caerulescens (Cooke) Sacc.: Psilocybe cookei Singer; non Psilocybe callosa (Fr. : Fr.) Quel., which is Psilocybe strictipes Singer & A.H. Smith]
 Psilocybe septentrionalis (Guzman) Guzmán (a.k.a. Psilocybe subaeriginascens Hohn. var. septentrionalis Guzmán )
 Psilocybe serbica Moser & Horak (non ss. Krieglsteiner)
 Psilocybe sierrae Singer (a.k.a. Psilocybe subfimetaria Guzmán & A.H. Sm.)
 Psilocybe silvatica (Peck) Singer & A.H. Smith
 Psilocybe singeri Guzmán
 Psilocybe singularis Guzmán, Escalona & J. Q. Jacobs
 Psilocybe strictipes Singer & A.H. Smith (a.k.a. Psilocybe callosa (Fr. : Fr.) Quel. s.Guzmán, 1983; Psilocybe semilanceata var. obtusa Bon; Psilocybe semilanceata var. microspora Singer)
 Psilocybe stuntzii Guzmán & Ott
 Psilocybe subacutipilea Guzmán, Saldarriaga, Pineda, Garcia & Velazquez
 Psilocybe subaeruginascens Hohn. var. subaeruginascens Psilocybe subaeruginosa Cleland
 Psilocybe subcaerulipes Hongo
 Psilocybe subcubensis Guzmán
 Psilocybe subheliconiae Guzmán, Ram.-Guill. & M.Torres
 Psilocybe subhoogshagenii Guzmán, M.Torres & Ram.-Guill.
 Psilocybe subpsilocybioides Guzmán, Lodge & S.A. Cantrell
 Psilocybe subtropicalis Guzmán

 T 
 Psilocybe tampanensis Guzmán & S.H.PollockPsilocybe tasmaniana Guzmán & Watling
 Psilocybe thaicordispora Guzmán, Ram.-Guill. & Karun.
 Psilocybe thaiaerugineomaculans Guzmán, Karun. & Ram.-Guill.
 Psilocybe thaiduplicatocystidiata Guzmán, Karun. & Ram.-Guill.
 Psilocybe tuxtlensis Guzmán 1983

 U 
 Psilocybe uruguayensis Singer ex Guzmán
 Psilocybe uxpanapensis Guzmán

 V 
 Psilocybe venenata (S. Imai) Imaz. & Hongo (a.k.a. Stropharia caerulescens S. Imai)
 Psilocybe verae-crucis Guzmán & Perez-Ortiz

 W 
 Psilocybe washingtonensis A.H.Sm.
 Psilocybe wayanadensis K.A. Thomas, Manim. & Guzmán
 Psilocybe weldenii Guzmán
 Psilocybe weraroa Borov., Oborník & Noordel.
 Psilocybe weraroa var. subsecotioides Y 
 Psilocybe yungensis Singer & A.H. Smith (a.k.a. Psilocybe yungensis var. diconica Singer & A.H. Smith; Psilocybe yungensis var. acutopapillata Singer & A.H. Smith; Psilocybe isaurii Singer; Psilocybe acutissima R. Heim; Psilocybe subyungensis Guzmán)

 Z 
 Psilocybe zapotecoantillarum Guzmán, T.J. Baroni & Lodge
 Psilocybe zapotecocaribaea Guzmán, Ram.-Guill. & T.J. Baroni
 Psilocybe zapotecorum R. Heim emend. Guzmán (a.k.a. Psilocybe candidipes Singer & A.H. Sm., Psilocybe aggericola Singer & A.H. Sm., Psilocybe aggericola var. alvaradoi Singer & A.H. Sm., Psilocybe zapotecorum f. elongata R. Heim, Psilocybe bolivarii Guzmán, Psilocybe barrerae Cifuentes & Guzmán, Psilocybe sanctorum Guzmán, Psilocybe microcystidiata Guzmán & Bononi, Psilocybe zapotecorum var. ramulosum Guzmán & Bononi, Psilocybe zapotecorum var. ramulosa Guzmán & Bononi, Psilocybe ramulosa Guzmán & Bononi, Psilocybe subzapotecorum Guzmán, Psilocybe pseudozapotecorum Guzmán, and Psilocybe chaconii'' Guzmán, Escalona & Ram.-Guill.)

See also
Mushroom hunting
Psilocybin mushroom

References

Entheogens
Psilocybe
Psychoactive fungi
Psychedelic tryptamine carriers